Pieces of a Man is a 1971 album by Gil Scott-Heron.

Pieces of a Man may also refer to:
 Pieces of a Man (band)
Pieces of a Man (AZ Album) (1998)
 Pieces of a Man (Mick Jenkins album) (2018)

See also 
 Pieces of a Dream (disambiguation)
 Pieces of a Woman, a 2020 drama film by Kornél Mundruczó